Michael Spöttel is a German former marathon runner and author. As a runner, he won the 1978 Berlin Marathon, and came third in the marathon race at the 1983 Summer Universiade. He won West German National Championships in the marathon and 25 km race.

Running career
In 1977, he won the West German junior 10,000 metres, and team cross-country running titles.

Spöttel won the 1978 Berlin Marathon in a time of 2:20:03, four minutes ahead of Michael Weiß who finished second. In 1979, he won the marathon event at the West German National Championships in a time of 2:20:15. In 1982, Spöttel won the  race at the German National Championships.

He came third in the marathon race at the 1983 Summer Universiade. In the same year, he won the  half-marathon event. In 1984, he set the Lower Saxony regional marathon record, finishing in a time of 2:12:53. That year, he set a personal best time of 2:12:51 at the Houston Marathon. He competed in the marathon event at the 1987 World Championships in Athletics, finishing 19th.

Spöttel retired in 1990.

Personal life
Spöttel was born in Bad Nauheim, West Germany, and grew up in Bremen. He studied ethnology in Munich, and also earned a PhD.

Works
 Die ungeliebte "Zivilisation" (The unloved "civilisation"), Lang, 1995 (in German)
 Hamiten (Hamites), Lang, 1996 (in German)
 Max Weber und die jüdische Ethik (Max Weber and the Jewish ethics), Lang, 1997 (in German)
 Vergebliche Hoffnung (Futile hope), 2006 (in German)

Source:

References

External links

Living people
German male marathon runners
German male cross country runners
West German male long-distance runners
Berlin Marathon male winners
Medalists at the 1983 Summer Universiade
Universiade bronze medalists in athletics (track and field)
Universiade bronze medalists for West Germany
People from Bad Nauheim
Sportspeople from Darmstadt (region)
Year of birth missing (living people)